Brian Wilkinson (born 12 February 1938) is an Australian former swimmer. He competed in the men's 200 metre butterfly at the 1956 Summer Olympics.

References

External links
 

1938 births
Living people
Australian male butterfly swimmers
Olympic swimmers of Australia
Swimmers at the 1956 Summer Olympics
Commonwealth Games medallists in swimming
Commonwealth Games gold medallists for Australia
Commonwealth Games bronze medallists for Australia
Swimmers at the 1958 British Empire and Commonwealth Games
20th-century Australian people
Medallists at the 1958 British Empire and Commonwealth Games